San Joaquin General Hospital is a 196-bed public teaching hospital located within the San Joaquin County area of French Camp, California, United States. San Joaquin General Hospital, funded by San Joaquin County, originally established in 1857, is a general acute care facility providing a full range of inpatient services including General Medical/Surgical Care, High-Risk Obstetrics and Neonatal Intensive Care, Pediatrics and Acute Physical Medicine and Rehabilitation. The hospital is the only trauma center serving the 700,000 residents of San Joaquin County.  San Joaquin General Hospital is also a primary stroke center and the county's EMS base station.  The county's EMS administrative and education facility is immediately adjacent to the hospital.

The hospital offers physician residencies in family medicine, internal medicine, and general surgery.  The physician residencies are affiliated with the University of California, Davis School of Medicine.  The hospital also has a pharmacy residency program, and is a teaching site for the University of the Pacific School of Pharmacy.

See also
Hospitals in California

References

External links
Official Website
This hospital in the CA Healthcare Atlas A project by OSHPD

Hospital buildings completed in 1857
County hospitals in California
1857 establishments in California
Trauma centers